World Series Baseball is a computer and video game series published by Sega from 1994 to 2003. The series would be succeeded by 2004's ESPN Major League Baseball.

Visual Concepts would take over development of the series with 2001's World Series Baseball 2K2, and go on to develop 2K Sports' MLB 2K series following its acquisition by Take-Two Interactive.

Games
The games in the series include:

World Series Baseball, the first game in this series
World Series Baseball, Saturn version
World Series Baseball '95
World Series Baseball '96
World Series Baseball II
World Series Baseball '98
World Series Baseball 2K1
World Series Baseball 2K2
World Series Baseball 2K3

Cover Athletes

References

World Series Baseball video games